Convoy PQ 11 was an Arctic convoy sent from Great Britain by the Western Allies to aid the Soviet Union during World War II.
It sailed in February 1942 and arrived in Murmansk without loss.

Voyage
PQ 11 sailed from Loch Ewe, Scotland on 7 February 1942 to Kirkness, Iceland arriving on 14 February, before continuing on to Murmansk for 22 February. The convoy was undetected by German aircraft or U-boats in the continuous darkness of the polar night, and arrived safely at Murmansk, the Soviet Union's only ice-free Arctic port.

Ships
PQ 11 consisted of 13 merchant ships; eight British, two  Soviet, one American, one of Panamanian and one of Honduran registry. 
These were supported by the cruiser .

The convoy was joined in the last stage of the voyage by two Soviet destroyers and five Royal Navy minesweepers based at Murmansk.

Ships in the convoy

References

 Clay Blair : Hitler's U-Boat War Vol I (1996) 
 Paul Kemp : Convoy! Drama in Arctic Waters (1993) 
 Bernard Schofield : (1964) The Russian Convoys BT Batsford  ISBN (none) 
  PQ 11 at Convoyweb

PQ 11